Whorwood is a surname. Notable people with the surname include:

 Jane Whorwood (1612–1684), English spy
 Matthew Whorwood (born 1989), British Paralympic swimmer 
 Thomas Whorwood (1544–1616), English politician
 Thomas Whorwood (1718–1771), High Sheriff of Oxfordshire
 William Whorwood ( 1500–1545), English lawyer

See also
 Horwood (surname)